Shamim Chowdhury is an English television and print journalist.

Early life
Chowdhury's parents were born in East Pakistan and emigrated to the United Kingdom in the early 1970s. She is of Sylheti heritage. The late general Muhammad Ataul Gani Osmani, the commander-in-chief of the East Pakistani liberation forces of 1971, is her great uncle and grew up in the same household as her paternal grandfather, the late Azadur Rahman Chowdhury, who himself was the postmaster general of the Sylhet district of Bangladesh.

Chowdhury has a BSc from Queen Mary University, a MSc from Birkbeck College, and a post-graduate diploma in newspaper journalism from City University London.

Career
Chowdhury started out in print journalism and has written for a number of British national newspapers, including The Daily Express, The Daily Mail, The Daily Telegraph, and The Independent, where she wrote a number of op-eds on a range of socio-political issues. She also used to have her own column in the English-language Bangladeshi newspaper, Bangla Mirror.

In 2007, Chowdhury started working for Al Jazeera English as a deputy news editor. Her later roles included news editor, reporter and producer. She was based mainly in London, but also worked occasionally in the main news centre in Doha, Qatar. She was involved in a wide range of stories for the channel, including the 2013 Ukraine crisis, the collapse of the Rana Plaza building complex in Bangladesh and the Bangladeshi elections. She was regarded as the channel's Bangladesh expert.

Since 2015, she has been working as a foreign correspondent for the Turkish television news channel, TRT World. During this time she has reported from inside Syria, Iraq, South Korea, Jerusalem, Bangladesh, Mongolia, Sri Lanka, the Philippines and many European countries. She also produced and reported an exclusive series of reports on Bangladesh's burgeoning economy, including a half-hour documentary of the subject.

Her interviews include Binali Yildirim, former Turkish Prime Minister; Gowher Rizvi, International Affairs Adviser to Bangladeshi Prime Minister Sheikh Hasina; and Kamal Hossain, leader of the Bangladeshi opposition.

She has also written extensively for The Huffington Post on a wide range of socio-political issues.

Her previous television experience includes work at the BBC, ITN, and Sky News.

Chowdhury has taken part in current affairs and politics debates at The House of Lords and on live television discussion programmes.

Since October 2013, Chowdhury has been a judging panel member at the Asian Media Awards.

Personal life
Chowdhury is a Muslim and lives in West London. She has visited more than 65 countries including parts of the Middle East, Africa and Asia. On one occasion, she worked with a leading charity to help build a community centre in a remote part of Cambodia.

See also
 British Bangladeshi
 List of British Bangladeshis

References

External links
 
 Shamim Chowdhury on LinkedIn
 Shamim Chowdhury on Al Jazeera English
 Shamim Chowdhury on The Huffington Post
 Shamim Chowdhury on My Action Aid

Living people
Year of birth missing (living people)
English Muslims
English people of Bangladeshi descent
English women journalists
English television journalists
English newspaper editors
English columnists
British women columnists
Women newspaper editors
Muslim writers
British Asian writers
21st-century English women writers
Al Jazeera people
Daily Mail journalists
Daily Express people
The Daily Telegraph people
The Independent people
Bangla Mirror people
BBC newsreaders and journalists
Sky News newsreaders and journalists
ITN newsreaders and journalists
Journalists from London
Alumni of Queen Mary University of London
Alumni of City, University of London
British women television journalists
British women radio presenters